Cedar is an unincorporated community in Twin Falls County, Idaho, United States, roughly midway between Buhl and Filer. Cedar is located along U.S. Route 30.

Cedar is part of the Twin Falls, Idaho Metropolitan Statistical Area.

See also

References

Unincorporated communities in Idaho
Unincorporated communities in Twin Falls County, Idaho